Mónica Molina Tejedor is a Spanish actress and singer with a distinctive Mediterranean style in her albums. She is the daughter of well-known singer Antonio Molina.

Her album, "Vuela", was nominated for the 2002 Latin Grammy awards.

Her albums have received a popular interest in Turkey, where she have had several concerts both independently and as a part of international music festivals including Istanbul International Jazz Festival and Antalya International Jazz Festival.

External links 
 Biography on IMDb.
 Biography on Wikipedia in Spanish.
 Yahoo! Music page.
 LA Times 2002 Latin Grammy nominations.
 Monica Molina fan website.
 Antalya International Jazz Festival homepage.

Spanish film actresses
Spanish television actresses
Spanish women singers
1968 births
Living people